Hauert HBG Dünger is the oldest Swiss producer of fertilizers for the horticulture and organic farming, founded in 1663 and located in Grossaffoltern, Canton of Bern.

History 
On 18 June 1663 Adam Hauert received the concession to operate a tannery. Each tanning operation included a dumping bump for crushing the oak bark. But it was also used to destroy animal bones. The peasants brought the crushed bones as fertilizer to the fields.

From the middle of the 18th century onwards, fertilization became more and more important. The Economic Society of Berne supported the systematic collection of manure and urine into manure pits. Since farmyard fertilizers soon could no longer meet demand, the demand for bone meal, marl, and lime rose since the beginning of the nineteenth century. In addition, Justus von Liebig (1803-1873), with his mineral theory of 1840, prepared the way for the fertilizer industry.

See also 
List of oldest companies

References 

Article contains translated text from Hauert HBG Dünger on the German Wikipedia retrieved on 24 March 2017.

External links 
Homepage

Fertilizer companies of Switzerland
Companies established in the 17th century
17th-century establishments in Switzerland